Evergestis marocana is a species of moth in the family Crambidae. It is found in France, Portugal and North Africa, including Morocco.

The wingspan is about 18 mm. Adults are on wing from May to October in two generations per year.

References

Moths described in 1856
Evergestis
Moths of Europe
Moths of Africa